Anzhou District formerly An County is a district of the city of Mianyang, in northeastern Sichuan province, China.

Administrative divisions
Anzhou has 15 towns and three townships.

Towns:
Huagai (花荄镇)
Sangzao (桑枣镇)
Huangtu (黄土镇)
Tashui (塔水镇)
Xiushui (秀水镇)
Heqing (河清镇)
Jiepai (界牌镇)
Yonghe (永河镇)
Jushui (睢水镇)
Qingquan (清泉镇)
Baolin (宝林镇)
Feishui (沸水镇)
Xiaoba (晓坝镇)
Lexing (乐兴镇)
Qianfo (千佛镇)
Townships:
Xingren (兴仁乡)
Gaochuan (高川乡)
Yingxin (迎新乡)

Climate

References

External links
Official website of Anzhou Government

Districts of Sichuan
Mianyang